F.C. Dimona, Moadon Sport Dimona, lit. Dimona Sport Club (or in short  Mem Samekh Dimona, lit. F.C. Dimona) is an Israeli football club based in Dimona. The club is currently in Liga Alef South.

History
F.C. Dimona founded in 2004 a one season after Hapoel Dimona dissolved, but are still commonly known and referred as Hapoel Dimona. The club reached Liga Bet in the 2005–06 season, where they played in the South B division. Ten years later the club promoted to Liga Alef, after won 2015–16 season.

Honours

League

External links
 Moadon Sport Dimona The Israel Football Association

References

Dimona
Association football clubs established in 2004
2004 establishments in Israel
Dimona